The 2019 Oracle Challenger Series – Houston was a professional tennis tournament played on outdoor hard courts. This tournament was part of the 2019 ATP Challenger Tour and the 2019 WTA 125K series. The second edition took place at the George R. Brown Tennis Center from November 10 to 17, 2019 in Houston, United States.

Men's singles main-draw entrants

Seeds

 1 Rankings are as of 4 November 2019.

Other entrants
The following players received wildcards into the singles main draw:
  Mohamed Abdel-Aziz
  Oliver Crawford
  Brandon Holt
  Zane Khan
  Sumit Sarkar

The following players received entry from the qualifying draw:
  Alafia Ayeni
  Alexis Galarneau

Women's singles main-draw entrants

Seeds

 1 Rankings are as of 4 November 2019.

Other entrants
The following players received wildcards into the singles main draw:
  Danielle Collins
  Linda Huang
  Katarina Jokić
  Bethanie Mattek-Sands
  CoCo Vandeweghe

The following player received entry into the singles main draw through protected ranking:
  Irina Falconi

The following players received entry from the qualifying draw:
  Catherine Bellis
  Sophie Chang

The following player received entry into the main draw as lucky loser:
  Kayla Day

Withdrawals
  Sara Errani → replaced by  Fanny Stollár
  Jaimee Fourlis → replaced by  Hanna Chang
  Mayo Hibi → replaced by  Kayla Day
  Katarzyna Kawa → replaced by  Grace Min
  Kristína Kučová → replaced by  Mari Osaka
  Anastasiya Komardina → replaced by  Catherine Harrison
  Asia Muhammad → replaced by  Deniz Khazaniuk
  Jessica Pegula → replaced by  Hailey Baptiste
  Olivia Rogowska → replaced by  Gabriela Cé
  Katherine Sebov → replaced by  Giuliana Olmos
  Katie Swan → replaced by  Anna Danilina
  Patricia Maria Țig → replaced by  Quinn Gleason

Women's doubles main-draw entrants

Seeds 

 1 Rankings as of 4 November 2019.

Other entrants 
The following pair received a wildcard into the doubles main draw:
  Hailey Baptiste /  Ellie Douglas

Champions

Men's singles

 Marcos Giron def  Ivo Karlović 7–5, 6–7(5–7), 7–6(11–9).

Women's singles

  Kirsten Flipkens def.  CoCo Vandeweghe 7–6(7–4), 6–4

Men's doubles

 Jonathan Erlich /  Santiago González def.  Ariel Behar /  Gonzalo Escobar 6–3, 7–6(7–4).

Women's doubles

  Ellen Perez /  Luisa Stefani def.  Sharon Fichman /  Ena Shibahara, 1–6, 6–4, [10–5]

References

External links 
 Official website

2019
2019 ATP Challenger Tour
2019 WTA 125K series
2019 in American tennis
November 2019 sports events in the United States